Mount Louis Saint Laurent is a  mountain located at co-ordinates  in the Premier Range of the Cariboo Mountains in the east-central interior of British Columbia, Canada.  The mountain is to the west of the David Glacier and overlooks the Raush River.

The name honours the twelfth Prime Minister of Canada, Louis Saint Laurent, who died in 1973. The mountain was officially named after Saint Laurent in 1964.

External links

Canadian Mountain Encyclopedia listing for Mount Louis Saint Laurent
British Columbia Government Information Sheet for the Premier Range

Three-thousanders of British Columbia
Cariboo Mountains
Cariboo Land District